Andrew Chanel Pattison (2 November 1885 – 12 June 1952) was an Australian rules footballer who played for the Carlton Football Club, Fitzroy Football Club and Richmond Football Club in the Victorian Football League (VFL).

Notes

External links 
	
 	
Andy Pattison's profile at Blueseum

1885 births
1952 deaths
Australian rules footballers from Victoria (Australia)
Carlton Football Club players
Fitzroy Football Club players
Richmond Football Club players